Joseph Lunardi is an American college basketball analyst for ESPN.

He was born in Philadelphia, attended Saint Joseph's Preparatory School in Philadelphia, as well as Damien High School in CA, and is a Saint Joseph's University alumnus. Lunardi currently lives outside of Philadelphia, Pennsylvania.  He is best known for creating Bracketology, which he calls the "art and science" of predicting the teams that will be selected in the annual NCAA Men's Basketball Tournament. He is well known as the resident bracketologist for ESPN. In addition to his duties at ESPN, he is the Assistant Vice President of Marketing Communications at Saint Joseph's University and does color commentary for men's basketball for the Saint Joseph's Hawks. Lunardi correctly predicted all 65 teams to appear in the 2008 NCAA tournament.

Lunardi has stated that his first bracket for ESPN received 250,000 hits in the first 90 minutes posted. His brackets sometimes receive millions of hits over the course of a season. Since then, he has been a fixture on ESPN's Bracketology program and on SportsCenter, especially during the months of February and March in the run-up to the NCAA Tournament.

References

Year of birth missing (living people)
Living people
Saint Joseph's University alumni
American color commentators
Television personalities from Philadelphia
Sportswriters from Pennsylvania